Mae St. John Bramhall (Laws; after adoption, St. John; after marriage, St. John Bramhall; c. 1861 – February 1897) was a 19th-century American actress and versatile writer who contributed to many magazines and newspapers. She inherited the gifts of song and poesy from her mother, Cornelia Laws St. John.

Early life and education
Born Mae Laws, she was the second daughter of Joseph and Cornelia (Williams) Laws. Mae was born c. 1861, in Richmond, Indiana, and resided there until almost of adult age, when the family removed to Chicago, Illinois.

She received her education in the public schools of Richmond and Chicago, with a short period at St. Mary's School at Reddington, Ohio.

Before starting her theater career, she was regarded as the most beautiful woman in Chicago society.

Career
Bramhall was performing in comic opera in the 1880s.

In 1889, she married Anson Dudley Bramhall, of New York City, and the following two years were spent in Japan. There, she wrote and published her first book, Japanese Jingles, which she dedicated to her uncle and aunt, Dr. and Mrs. James F. Hibberd. Charles Scribner & Sons had the exclusive sale of these books in America, which sale they deemed phenomenal. 
She also wrote letters for several prominent American newspapers during her stay in Japan. When financial reverses came, her husband failed in business, and separation followed.

While a resident of El Paso, Texas, Bramhall visited the World's Columbian Exposition in Chicago in 1893. By 1894, she was a resident of New York City and was writing sketches of baby life in Japan for Harper's Bazaar . She expanded them into a volume which the Harpers brought out with illustrations by Charles Dater Weldon (1844-1935). Entitled, The Wee Ones of Japan, it described the Japanese child from babyhood to its school days, including its dress, its ways, its play and study, and the customs which surround it. She also published Around the World at Leisure Letters.

Death and legacy
For the last two years of her life, Bramhall was a recluse and her friends and former admirers heard but little of her. She suffered much before her death, which occurred February 5 or 7, 1897, age 36, at the Home for Incurables, Fordham, Bronx, New York. A number of unpublished manuscripts were the only legacy she left to her adopted son, Dudley Bramhall, of Chappaqua, New York.

"The Japanese Good Morning"
A fall to the knees,
A turn to the toes, 
A spread of the hands, 
And a dip of the nose.
It takes all these just to say "Good-day" 
In Chrysanthemum-land so far away.
—"The Japanese Good Morning", by Mae St. John Bramhall, in the January 1897, St. Nicholas Magazine.

Selected works
 Japanese Jingles (Tokyo: T. Hasegawa, 1891)
 The Wee Ones of Japan (New York: Harper & Brothers, 1894)
 Around the World at Leisure Letters

Notes

References

Attribution
 

1861 births
1897 deaths
19th-century American actresses
19th-century American poets
American women poets
People from Richmond, Indiana